Gerwin is a Dutch and German given name, containing the Germanic roots ger ("spear") and win ("friend").  Notable people with the name include:

Gerwin Pardoel (born 1981), Dutch rapper known as Gers
Gerwin van der Werf (born 1969), Dutch novelist and composer

See also 
 Gervin
 Gerwen, a village in Dutch Brabant, derived from "Gerwin's home"
 Georg Gottfried Gervinus (1805–1871), German literary and political historian

References

Dutch masculine given names
German masculine given names